Dave Roberts (born February 28, 1947) is an American former college football player and coach. He served as the head football coach at Western Kentucky University (1984–1988), Northeast Louisiana University (1989–1993), and Baylor University (1997–1998), compiling a career head coaching record of 67–68–3.

Coaching career

Northeast Louisiana
Roberts was the eighth head football coach at Northeast Louisiana University—known as the University of Louisiana at Monroe—located in Monroe, Louisiana and he held that position for five seasons, from 1989 until 1993. His coaching record at Northeast Louisiana was 38–19–2, including a forfeit by Louisiana Tech in 1989.

Baylor
Roberts was the head football coach at Baylor University from 1997 to 1998. He ignited controversy in 1997 when, after a loss to Texas Tech, he stated in a post-game press conference that he had told his players that "they were about as bad a football team as there is right now in America", drawing the ire of the Baylor faithful. Following the 1998 season, in which the Bears went 2–9 for a second consecutive season, he was fired by athletic director Tom Stanton. Roberts had previously served as the offensive coordinator under Lou Holtz at the University of Notre Dame. After being fired by Baylor he rejoined Holtz as an offensive assistant at the University of South Carolina.

After 1956 and until 2010, Roberts was the only Baylor head football coach other than Grant Teaff to beat the Texas Longhorns, doing so in 1997 (Grant Teaff coached Baylor for 21 years and had many victories over the Longhorns).

Head coaching record

References

1947 births
Living people
American football linebackers
Baylor Bears football coaches
Davidson Wildcats football coaches
Eastern Kentucky Colonels football coaches
Louisiana–Monroe Warhawks football coaches
Notre Dame Fighting Irish football coaches
South Carolina Gamecocks football coaches
Vanderbilt Commodores football coaches
Western Carolina Catamounts football players
Western Kentucky Hilltoppers football coaches
People from Greenville County, South Carolina
Players of American football from South Carolina